Jaleen Smith (born November 24, 1994) is an American-born Croatian professional basketball player for Alba Berlin of the German Basketball Bundesliga (BBL) and the EuroLeague.

Club career
In 2019, Smith switched teams from USC Heidelberg to Riesen Ludwigsburg. 

For the 2020–21 Basketball Bundesliga season, Smith was elected as Most Valuable Player. He received the award at the same time as his coach John Patrick became Coach of the year. Smith averaged 15.7 points, 5.3 rebounds, 5.6 assists and 1.7 steals per game.

On August 25, 2021, Smith signed a three-year deal with Alba Berlin.

National team career 
In July 2022, the Croatian Basketball Federation expressed their interest to naturalize Smith, so he could represent the Croatia national team at the EuroBasket 2022. In August 2022, Smith debuted for Croatia in a friendly against Bulgaria. His first official game was a EuroBasket 2025 pre-qualifier against Poland. Smith is the third naturalized American to play for Croatia, after Dontaye Draper and Oliver Lafayette.

References

External links
Proballers profile 
German BBL profile
New Hampshire Wildcats bio

1994 births
Living people
Alba Berlin players
American expatriate basketball people in Germany
American men's basketball players
Basketball players from Texas
Croatian expatriate basketball people in Germany
Croatian men's basketball players
Croatian people of African-American descent
Naturalized citizens of Croatia
New Hampshire Wildcats men's basketball players
People from Freeport, Texas
Riesen Ludwigsburg players
Shooting guards
USC Heidelberg players